William David Doherty, M.A., M.Ch., F.R.C.S., known as George Doherty was a medical superintendent of Guy's Hospital, London, and a former captain of the Ireland national rugby union team.

Early life
William David Doherty was born on 17 July 1893, in south London. He attended Dulwich College where he played rugby and for three years represented his school at the Public Schools boxing championships. He proceeded to King's College, Cambridge, to study medicine. Having broken his education to serve in the first world war, he graduated B.A. in 1917. He immediately entered Guy's Hospital Medical School, qualifying with the Conjoint diploma in 1920.

Rugby career

By the time George Doherty entered Guy's his reputation as a rugby forward was already well established. Whilst at Dulwich College he played in an unbeaten first XV in 1909 which contained five future internationals dubbed the 'Famous Five'. These five would all go on to play in the 1913 Varsity match, (and also produced the captains of both Oxford and Cambridge in 1919), and all served in the First World War. They were Eric Loudoun-Shand and Grahame Donald who both went on to play for Scotland, Doherty himself who went on to play for and captain Ireland, Jenny Greenwood who went on to play for and captain England and the record-breaking Cyril Lowe.

From Dulwich College, Doherty went to Cambridge University. He was selected for the 1913 varsity match. On his team were two of his former school team mates, CN Lowe and JE Greenwood, on the opposing side were Eric Loudoun-Shand and Graham Donald also from Dulwich. After the first world war Doherty was selected to play for Ireland. In addition, at Cambridge he was also awarded a half-Blue for water polo.

Guy's benefited from having Doherty in their side, but he was not the lone international playing for the side. The Guy's side that he captained for three years, played in the post-war years in which Guy's was regarded as the amongst the finest, if not the finest, club side in the country. It also included many famous players from South Africa (at one point there were 14 South Africans and himself.) and Wales. Doherty's former school friend and fellow international, Eric Loudoun-Shand, said that Doherty was "the lightest and toughest forward, a player who was always on the ball, and a magnificent leader." This view was born out by the fact whilst captain of Guy's Doherty was also capped seven times for Ireland and captained them in 1921. In 1921 he was also the captain of the United Hospitals RFC. In one season, he captained Ireland, United Hospitals, Surrey and Guy's.

After his playing days were over, Doherty maintained a strong relationship with Guy's Hospital Rugby and served as President from 1943-1951.

Medical career

Personal and later life
In 1922 George Doherty married Annie Ruth Margaret Barber and they had two sons and a daughter. When he retired in 1958 he continued to serve the hospital and in 1961 he was appointed a Governor and was Chairman of the Nursing and Nurses Education Committee. He was also a Governor of the Medical School. He was also a member of a number of medical dining clubs, one of which, the Cambridge Medical Graduates Club, he was president. After his retirement he was also an active mason and regularly visited South Africa.

He died suddenly on 31 March 1966 a week after an operation on his hip.

References

 

1893 births
1966 deaths
20th-century English medical doctors
Alumni of King's College, Cambridge
English people of Irish descent
Ireland international rugby union players
People educated at Dulwich College
Place of death missing
Rugby union locks
Rugby union players from Wandsworth
Surrey RFU players
Military personnel from London
British military personnel of World War I